Admiral Evangelos Apostolakis is a Greek naval officer. After leading the Hellenic Navy General Staff in 2013–2015, he served as the Chief of the Hellenic National Defence General Staff until 14 January 2019, and then, until 9 July 2019, as the Minister of National Defence of Greece.

Career
He was born in Rethymno in 1957, entered the Hellenic Navy Academy in 1976 and graduated in 1980 as a Line Ensign. He has served in a succession of command and staff positions aboard ships, and senior staff positions in the Hellenic Navy and NATO, as well as completing the Underwater Demolition School of the Hellenic Navy's elite Underwater Demolition Command (DYK), which he later commanded, the Advanced Mine Warfare School in Belgium and the US Amphibious Warfare School.

On 7 March 2013, the Government Council for Foreign Affairs and Defence (KYSEA) appointed him to the post of Chief of the Hellenic Navy General Staff. On 20 August 2015, KYSEA selected him as the successor of General Michail Kostarakos as Chief of the Hellenic National Defence General Staff, promoting him to full Admiral. The order took effect on 15 September.

Following the resignation of Minister of National Defence Panos Kammenos on 13 January 2019, Apostolakis was named as his successor by Prime Minister Alexis Tsipras. He was placed into retirement and immediately sworn in as Minister of National Defence on 14 January, with the official hand-over scheduled for 15 January. Until the appointment of a new Chief of the HNDGS by KYSEA, the Deputy Chief, Lt. General Konstantinos Floros, was named acting Chief.

Greece–Turkey relations 
In December 2018, Apostolakis was quoted at meeting with defence ministry correspondents as saying, "If the Turks land on a Greek rock islet we will flatten it." He also stated that efforts were focused on avoiding a military conflict with Turkey.

Dates of rank

Awards 
 Grand Cross of the Order of the Phoenix (Greece)
 Commander of the Order of Honour (Greece)
 Commander of the National Order of Merit (France)
 Knights Commander's Cross of the Order of Merit of the Federal Republic of Germany

References

External links 

1957 births
People from Rethymno
Hellenic Navy admirals
Ministers of National Defence of Greece
Chiefs of the Hellenic National Defence General Staff
Chiefs of the Hellenic Navy General Staff
Living people
Commanders of the Order of Honour (Greece)
Grand Crosses of the Order of the Phoenix (Greece)
20th-century Greek military personnel
21st-century Greek military personnel
Commanders of the Ordre national du Mérite
Knights Commander of the Order of Merit of the Federal Republic of Germany